The Siegrist's Mill Covered Bridge is an , Burr Arch Truss covered bridge over Chiques Creek between Rapho and West Hempfield townships, Lancaster County in U.S. state of Pennsylvania. Owned and maintained by the county, its official designation is the Big Chiques #6 Bridge.

The bridge's World Guide to Covered Bridges Number is 38-36-37. Added in 1980, it was listed on the National Register of Historic Places as structure number 80003513. The bridge is less than a mile away from the Forry's Mill Covered Bridge.

History
The bridge was built in 1885 by James C. Carpenter. It was named after the Siegrist family who lived nearby.

The bridge survived Hurricane Agnes in 1972 with only minor damage. However, the bridge was ripped from its foundations and swept downstream on September 8, 2011, by flooding caused by remnants of Tropical Storm Lee. The bridge's siding, roof and some structural members will need to be replaced. The repairs were expected to cost $750,000 and the bridge was planned to be reopened in November 2012., eventually re-opened in August 2013.

Design
The bridge has a single span, wooden, double Burr arch trusses design with the addition of steel hanger rods. The deck is made from oak planks.  It is painted red, the traditional color of Lancaster County covered bridges, on both the inside and outside. Both approaches to the bridge are painted in the traditional white color.

Dimensions 
Length:  span and  total length
Width:  clear deck and  total width
Overhead clearance: 
Underclearance:

Gallery

See also 

 List of bridges on the National Register of Historic Places in Pennsylvania
 List of covered bridges in Lancaster County, Pennsylvania
 National Register of Historic Places listings in Lancaster County, Pennsylvania

References

External links

 

Bridges completed in 1885
Covered bridges on the National Register of Historic Places in Pennsylvania
Buildings and structures demolished in 2011
Covered bridges in Lancaster County, Pennsylvania
Demolished bridges in the United States
Wooden bridges in Pennsylvania
Demolished buildings and structures in Pennsylvania
National Register of Historic Places in Lancaster County, Pennsylvania
Road bridges on the National Register of Historic Places in Pennsylvania
Burr Truss bridges in the United States